Transformational acquisition is an acquisition of a company or a division of it with the aim to jointly establish a new business model or to enrich the offer for its customers by different expertise and new solutions. This may be different production technologies or new capacity.

This definition is used in recent years only, but a significant number of mergers & acquisitions allocate their transaction to this type.

List of examples for Transformational Acquisitions

See also 

Mergers and acquisitions
Takeover
Management control
Management due diligence
Merger integration
Successor company

References 

Mergers and acquisitions
Corporate law
Competition